Rock the Opera is a rock orchestra from Prague, Czech Republic. It was established in 2015 by the German conductor Friedemann Riehle.

Rock the Opera performs rock songs from artists such as Queen, U2, Pink Floyd, Led Zeppelin or AC/DC along with a symphony orchestra, usually Prague Philharmonic Orchestra.

References

External links
Rock the Opera official site

Czech orchestras